The 1955–56 daytime network television schedule for the three major English-language commercial broadcast networks in the United States covers the weekday daytime hours from September 1955 to August 1956.

Talk shows are highlighted in yellow, local programming is white, reruns of prime-time programming are orange, game shows are pink, soap operas are chartreuse, news programs are gold and all others are light blue. New series are highlighted in bold.

Fall 1955

formerly Welcome Travelers

Winter 1955/1956

formerly The Morning Show

Spring 1956

Summer 1956

Comedy Time featured repeats of I Married Joan, So This Is Hollywood and It's Always Jan.

See also
1955-56 United States network television schedule (prime-time)
1955-56 United States network television schedule (late night)

Sources
https://web.archive.org/web/20071015122215/http://curtalliaume.com/abc_day.html
https://web.archive.org/web/20071015122235/http://curtalliaume.com/cbs_day.html
https://web.archive.org/web/20071012211242/http://curtalliaume.com/nbc_day.html
Castleman & Podrazik, The TV Schedule Book, McGraw-Hill Paperbacks, 1984
Hyatt, The Encyclopedia Of Daytime Television, Billboard Books, 1997
TV schedules, New York Times, September 1955 – September 1956 (microfilm)

United States weekday network television schedules
1955 in American television
1956 in American television